The discography of American R&B and soul singer and songwriter Syleena Johnson consists of nine studio albums, two collaborative albums, one greatest hits album, 29 singles, and eight music videos.

Albums

Studio albums

Demos

Collaborative albums

Compilation albums

Extended plays

Singles

As lead artist

As featured artist

Other charted songs

Videography

References

Discographies of American artists
Rhythm and blues discographies
Soul music discographies